Milton Range Halt was a halt between Denton Halt and Hoo Junction Staff Halt on the Hundred of Hoo Railway. It opened in July 1906 and closed to public use on 17 September 1932, although it remained open by special arrangement after that date until some time after 1956. It served Milton Range rifle range.

The station was constructed on a low embankment to the south of the Thames and Medway Canal beyond Higham, where the line climbs at 1 in 215 and then falls in a short cutting at 1 in 267. Initially, an island platform was provided, but this was removed in 1914 to be replaced by  wooden facing platforms. These were later rebuilt in concrete and survived beyond official closure to passenger traffic in 1932. At the eastern end of the platforms was a gated sleeper crossing which carried a public footpath over the line.

Ostensibly provided to serve the adjoining rifle range, Milton Range Halt was more frequently used by platelayers and railway workmen who would unload tools and materials at this desolate spot. For many years there was a long engineer's siding behind the down platform. By May 1915, special calls at the halt were being made by six down and five up services when requested; the  stationmaster was informed when special calls were to be made by down trains, whilst the  stationmaster was responsible for up trains. These stations had to telephone Milton Range Halt every time that a train was to call, with three minutes being allowed for the stop. This arrangement remained in force for the duration of the war.

The station was the site of an accident in August 1922 when a down passenger train held at the halt was struck from behind by another train, resulting in the death of five passengers. After the arrival of the 0540 workmen's train from Charing Cross to Strood at 0630, a number of workmen employed in the construction of the A2 road to the south alighted and crossed the line in front of the engine. They proceeded along the up line when they were struck in dense river fog by an up train, killing one workman and seriously injuring another. The accident caused the first train to be delayed at the halt where it was run into by the next workmen's special, timed to leave  at 0555 and to arrive at Milton Range Halt ten minutes after the first train. The collision resulted in the death of a third workman and fatal injuries to two others. The driver of the second train was found to be primarily responsible for the accident by passing a signal without observing its position.

The last remains of the derelict platforms survived until 2009.

References

Sources

External links
  Subterranea Britannica
 Kent Rail
 Milton Range Halt station on navigable 1940 O. S. map

Disused railway stations in Kent
Former South Eastern Railway (UK) stations
Railway stations in Great Britain opened in 1906
Railway stations in Great Britain closed in 1932
Gravesham
1922 disasters in the United Kingdom